Constantin "Costel" Rădulescu (5 October 1896 – 31 December 1981) was a footballer and manager from Romania who rose to prominence in the 1920s and 1930s. At one time or another Rădulescu had been associated with the Romania national team as either coach, manager or administrator within the Romanian Football Federation between 1923 and 1938.

First World War activity and playing career
Rădulescu served as an officer for the Romanian Army during World War I at the front in the Battle of Mărăști between 1916 and 1918 in which he had received injuries to his right arm. In 1919 he featured as a goalkeeper for the Romanian army team at the Inter-Allied Games held at the Pershing Stadium, in Paris.

After the end of the war, Rădulescu played football for Olympia București and Tricolor București until 1923. After 1923, Rădulescu switched to refereeing, coaching and administration and was involved in the development of the Romanian football federation in 1930, a development which put an end to the practice of the game being run in his country by a commission.

Romania's national team coach
His first spell as the coach of Romania's national team took place at age 27 in 1923 for only one game, a friendly which ended 2–2 against Turkey. His second spell started in 1928 at the 1928 Friendship Cup where he lost with 3–1 in front of Yugoslavia, but afterwards he earned victories against Bulgaria with 3–0, Greece with 8–1 and Yugoslavia with 2–1, before going at the 1930 World Cup where he earned Romania's first victory at the competition, a 3–1 against Peru, losing the second game of the group with 4–0 in front of hosts and eventually winners, Uruguay. During the competition, even do he was Romania's coach, Costel Rădulescu twice officiated as a linesman in matches featuring Argentina and Uruguay on those match days when the Romanians were not playing. He assisted as a linesman on other occasions when Romania was playing in the 1930s. He won the 1929–31 Balkan Cup campaign, which Romania won while losing only in Sofia with Bulgaria, but scoring healthily in all matches and defeating fellow World Cup entrants Yugoslavia in October 1929. He won another Balkan Cup in 1933 and the 1931–1934 Central European Cup for Amateurs, also earning the qualification for the 1934 World Cup from a group with Yugoslavia and Switzerland but at the final tournament Josef Uridil was brought as head coach, Rădulescu still remaining in the staff but with a minor role, the team losing the only game played there in the first round with 2–1 in front of Czechoslovakia. On his third spell, Rădulescu went on to win a third Balkan Cup in 1936 and the 1936 King Carol II Cup, defeating Yugoslavia with 3–2 courtesy of a hat-trick from Iuliu Bodola. He also took part as a technical director under coach Alexandru Săvulescu at the 1938 World Cup where they were eliminated in the first round by Cuba. He has a total of 49 matches as coach of Romania consisting of 27 victories, 7 draws and 15 losses.

Referee career
He was a referee for 20 years, refereeing 49 Divizia A matches, having over 200 matches as a total.

Honours

Manager
Romania
Balkan Cup: 1929–31, 1933, 1936
Central European International Cup: 1931–34
Records
Manager with the most Balkan Cup titles: 3 titles

References

1896 births
1981 deaths
1934 FIFA World Cup managers
1930 FIFA World Cup managers
1938 FIFA World Cup managers
Romanian footballers
Olympia București players
Unirea Tricolor București players
Romania national football team managers
Romanian football referees
Romanian military personnel of World War I
Association football goalkeepers
Romanian football managers
Sportspeople from Cluj-Napoca
People from the Kingdom of Hungary